Reynolds Arcade is an office building located in Rochester in Monroe County, New York.

Overview
It is an eleven-story, Art Deco style commercial / office building with arcaded shops on the first floor.  It was built in 1933 of steel frame construction and is faced on the exterior with Indiana limestone. The central portion of the building is a five bay, eleven story "tower" which steps back from the fifth floor.

It replaced a building with the same name that was constructed in 1829.  The most ambitious structure in Rochester at that time, it was, according to Joseph W. Barnes, a Rochester City Historian, "the center of Rochester downtown life for more than a century."

Recognition
It was listed on the National Register of Historic Places in 1985.

References

Skyscraper office buildings in Rochester, New York
Office buildings on the National Register of Historic Places in New York (state)
Art Deco skyscrapers
Commercial buildings completed in 1932
Art Deco architecture in Rochester, New York
National Register of Historic Places in Rochester, New York